Christian Thomas Shultz House is a historic home located near Winston-Salem, Forsyth County, North Carolina.  It was built about 1830, and is a two-story, log dwelling with a hall and parlor plan with a pair of exterior gable-end chimneys. It is sheathed in German siding. A one-story frame rear ell was added about 1945.  Also on the property is a contributing log smokehouse, dated to the late-1860s.

It was listed on the National Register of Historic Places in 2005.

References

Log houses in the United States
Houses on the National Register of Historic Places in North Carolina
Houses completed in 1830
Houses in Winston-Salem, North Carolina
National Register of Historic Places in Winston-Salem, North Carolina
1830 establishments in North Carolina
Log buildings and structures on the National Register of Historic Places in North Carolina